Kristijan Milaković (born April 21, 1992) is a Croatian professional water polo player who currently plays for Savona of the Serie A1 (water polo). He also represents the Croatia men's national water polo team. Although his primary positions are left or right flat (driver), he is polivalent player and he can play as Hole D as well. He is 203 cm tall and 105 kg heavy but his main advantage and the fact with whom he is making difference among other water polo players in the pool is 220 cm long arm span (reach).

Personal life
Kristijan Milaković was born and raised in Zagreb. He started with swimming, but at the age of 8 he switched to water polo.

In 2011 Milaković passed the entrance exam at the Zagreb School of Business to become a part-time undergraduate student of Communications management.

Club career

VK Medveščak Zagreb
Milaković started to play water polo at the age of 8 in VK Medveščak Zagreb. From first appearance he was considered as a major talent, what he proved through following years where he won numerous medals in youth (18) and junior (6) competitions and also by winning 4 individual awards. Because of his great performances he was transferred to senior team when he was 15 years old. After the first year where he collected experience and successfully overcame all the traps of senior age, his talent and skills once again came to the fore. His good performances were not missed by Mladost scouts who wanted to bring him in the summer of 2010, but Medveščak did not want to get rid of his services so easily. Milaković did not sink after an unsuccessful transfer, but became a leading player of VK Medveščak.  Especially he proved himself in Cup match against Mladost which resulted with the first victory of VK Medveščak after more than 40 years, where he was one of the most notable individuals. After the end of 2010/11 season two clubs made an agreement and Milaković finally became new player of Mladost.

HAVK Mladost Zagreb
After joining Mladost, Milaković started to adjust to new teammates and accordingly his performances varied.  His first notable performance with the  new club was in the 2011 Croatian Cup finals, where he played under temperature. That fact did not stop him from helping his team by scoring 2 goals in a monstrous win over Jug  who entered the finals as a huge favorite. He continued with playing his first season in "warm-cold" style with occasional flashes.  The first season with  Mladost ended magnificently since his performances helped the club to win its second bronze medal in a row in Champions League.

Accomplishments

Club competitions
Milaković won numerous medals in his youth (18) and junior (6) competitions while he was playing for VK Medveščak. As a part of the class of '92, who made great contribution to the club, he has a special place in club's showcase.

Milaković continued winning trophies while he was playing for HAVK Mladost and won 10 medals with his former club. The full table is listed below.

National team
In summer of 2007 Milaković joined the Croatian National Team and passed all youth and junior categories. In 2012 he passed to senior tem where he continued with conquering  medals for home country.

Career statistics

Club

International

Individual awards
 (2014) Top scorer of LEN Euro Cup
 (2011) Zagreb's best male sports team  - HAVK Mladost (common award for all players)
 (2009) All-star team of U18 World Championship in Šibenik
 (2009) Annual award from Zagreb Water polo Association  for extraordinary contribution in conquering of gold medal on U18 World Championship in Šibenik
 (2009) Annual award for best U17 water polo player from Zagreb Water polo Association
 (2008) MVP of U17 Croatian Championship
 (2008) MVP of U17 Croatian Cup
 (2007) MVP of U16 Christmas International Tournament in Kamnik, Slovenia
 (2007) MVP of U16 “Trophy of Belgrade” Tournament in Belgrade, Serbia

See also
 Glossary of water polo
 History of water polo

References

External links 
Kristijan Milaković at the Croatian Water Polo Federation web site 
Kristijan Milaković at the HAVK Mladost web site 
Official web site of the Como Nuoto 

Croatian male water polo players
1992 births
Living people
Sportspeople from Zagreb
21st-century Croatian people